Birot Khurd is a union council of Abbottabad District in Khyber-Pakhtunkhwa province of Pakistan. According to the 2017 Census of Pakistan, the population is 12,126.

Subdivisions
Birot Khurd
Kahoo Gharbi

References

Union councils of Abbottabad District